Detroit Harbor can refer to either:
 Detroit Harbor, Wisconsin, a town in Wisconsin
 Detroit Harbor (bay), a bay in Wisconsin